Poieni-Solca is a commune located in Suceava County, Romania. Composed of a single village, Poieni-Solca, it was established in 2007 when it was split from Solca town.

References

Communes in Suceava County
Localities in Southern Bukovina